Karl Wilhelm Osterwald (23 February 1820 in Bretsch (Altmark) – 27 March 1887 in Mühlhausen) was a German teacher, author, writer of Protestant church poetry and nature lover.

Life 
Osterwald studied at the Gymnasium in Salzwedel and the Franckesche Stiftungen in Halle an der Saale. He studied philology at the University of Halle and was later active as a teacher at the Königlichen Pädigogium in Halle and at the Domgymnasium in Merseburg. In 1865 he became headmaster of the Gymnasium in Mühlhausen.

During his period in Mühlhausen, he published many pedagogical writings and poems. Around 70 of his nature, travel, and love poems were set to music by composer Robert Franz. In 1889, his former student Richard von Hertwig pressed for the erection of a monument in his memory in the Mühlhäuser Stadtwald.
 
Osterwald, together with the cathedral organist Engel in Merseburg, prepared an edition of the Geistlichen Lieder of Johann Franck, providing new texts. Osterwald also wrote his own church songs. The Evangelical Lutheran hymnal of the early 20th century features his works including O du mein Trost und süßes Hoffen for Advent and Heilge Nacht, ich grüße dich for Christmas.

Osterward received the House Order of Hohenzollern.

Works 
Im Grünen, Poetry collection, 1853.
Im Freien, Poetry collection, 1862.
Bleibt einig! Zeitgedichte, 1870.
Deutschlands Auferstehung, 1871.

References 
 Franz Brümmer: Osterwald, Karl Wilhelm, in Allgemeine Deutsche Biographie (ADB), Volume 52, Duncker & Humblot: Leipzig 1906, p. 726f.
 Werner Baumgarten: Karl Wilhelm Osterwald, in: Mitteldeutsche Lebensbilder, 1. Band Lebensbilder des 19. Jahrhunderts, Magdeburg 1926, p. 252-257

External links 
 
 

1820 births
1887 deaths
People from Stendal (district)
People from the Province of Saxony
German Protestants
Heads of schools in Germany
German naturalists
German male writers
Writers from Saxony-Anhalt
19th-century German educators